Bayabas, officially the Municipality of Bayabas (Surigaonon: Lungsod nan Bayabas), is a 5th class municipality in the province of Surigao del Sur, Philippines. According to the 2020 census, it has a population of 8,979 people.

History

World War II
During 1943 and 1944 much of the east coast of Mindanao was occupied by the Japanese. Bayabas was not occupied, although at times Japanese navy ships anchored in the harbor off the coast of the town. As the Japanese occupied an increasing number of area coastal towns, refugees trickled into town. The prewar rector of San Nicolas School, in Surigao City, was one of a number of priests who sought refuge in Bayabas. Food supplies soon failed to reach town from the outside, since Japanese troops disrupted distribution.

Geography
Bayabas is located between Tago and Cagwait. The Tago River separates the municipalities of Tago and Bayabas. Bayabas is consist of seven barangays mostly located along the coastlines. Though Bayabas is a small municipality, it is also abundant in natural resources especially seafoods.

Barangays

Bayabas is politically subdivided into 7 barangays.
 Amag
 Balete (Poblacion)
 Cabugo
 Cagbaoto
 La Paz
 Magobawok (Poblacion)
 Panaosawon

Climate

Bayabas has a tropical rainforest climate (Af) with heavy to very heavy rainfall year-round and with extremely heavy rainfall in January.

Demographics

Economy

References

External links 

 Bayabas Profile at PhilAtlas.com
 Bayabas Profile at the DTI Cities and Municipalities Competitive Index
 [ Philippine Standard Geographic Code]
 Philippine Census Information
 Local Governance Performance Management System

Municipalities of Surigao del Sur